Gheorghe Manu  (26 July 1833, Bucharest, Wallachia – 16 May 1911, Bucharest, Kingdom of Romania) was a Romanian Army general, artillery inspector and statesman. He served as Prime Minister (1889–1891), Minister of War, Minister of the Interior, President of the Assembly of Deputies, and Mayor of Bucharest.

Biography
After he finished his high school studies in Romania, he went to Prussia in 1847 to study in the German military academies and in 1853, with the approval of the Romanian government, he joined the Prussian Army as a sub-lieutenant.

Returning to his country in 1858, he joined the Romanian Army, being charged with the organization of the Romanian artillery. He was in charge of this task until he resigned in 1884. From 1869 to 1870, Manu, a colonel, was part of the cabinets of Dimitrie Ghica and Manolache Costache Epureanu, heading the War Ministry. In 1874, he was chosen Mayor of Bucharest, keeping this function until 1877.  During his tenure, he initiated the creation of a modern water supply network for the city; the works were interrupted between 1877 and 1878, but by 1879 over ten kilometers of pipes were installed.

As the Romanian War of Independence began in 1877, General Manu was the commander of the 4th division, in charge of defending Romania in Oltenița, Corabia, Bechet, Islaz and Turnu Măgurele, but following the offensive, his division took part in the campaign on the plains of Bulgaria, in Pleven and Vidin. He was the first Romanian decorated with the Military Virtue Medal, in May 1877.

After the war, he was artillery inspector until 1888, when he resigned. He was  War Minister in the Theodor Rosetti and Lascăr Catargiu governments, between 12 November 1888 and 5 November 1889 (Old Style). He was also Prime Minister between 5 November 1889 and 15 February 1891. On 27 November 1891, in the Lascăr Catargiu cabinet, he became the Minister of State Property,  but quit to become the President of the Chamber of Deputies, a post he held until 1895, when he retired.

Publications

References

Gallery of caricatures

Drawn by Nicolae Petrescu-Găină

From Adevărul, 1899

1833 births
1911 deaths
Military personnel from Bucharest
Conservative Party (Romania, 1880–1918) politicians
Prime Ministers of Romania
Romanian Ministers of Agriculture
Romanian Ministers of Defence
Romanian Ministers of Finance
Romanian Ministers of Interior
Presidents of the Chamber of Deputies (Romania)
Members of the Chamber of Deputies (Romania)
Members of the Senate of Romania
Mayors of Bucharest
Romanian Land Forces generals
Romanian military personnel of the Russo-Turkish War (1877–1878)
Recipients of the Military Virtue Medal